Graphiola phoenicis is a plant pathogen of the palm Phoenix canariensis.

References

External links 
 Index Fungorum
 USDA ARS Fungal Database

Fungal plant pathogens and diseases
Ustilaginomycotina